Spiniphallellus desertus is a moth of the family Gelechiidae. It is found in Uzbekistan, Turkmenistan, Kazakhstan and Russia.

References

Moths described in 2008
Anomologini